The Pakistan women's national football team is the female representative in international women's football for Pakistan. The team was formed in 2010 and has not yet entered the AFC Women's Asian Cup or FIFA Women's World Cup, but has competed in four editions of the biennial SAFF Women's Championship.

Its under-19 and under-16 teams have competed in the qualification rounds of the 2019 AFC U-19 Women's Championship and 2019 AFC U-16 Women's Championship respectively.

History

Beginnings (2010–2011) 
The Pakistan women's national football team made its international debut at the 11th South Asian Games in Dhaka. Midfielder Ishrat Fatima of Lahore’s Sports Sciences Department (Punjab University) was the first captain of the team. It played its first match on 31 January 2010 against India at the Bangabandhu National Stadium. It also faced off against Bangladesh, Sri Lanka, and Nepal in that tournament, winning against Sri Lanka via walkover while losing the other two fixtures. It came in 4th out of 5 teams.

In November 2010, Tariq Lutfi was appointed as the coach of the team. In December 2010, the team, under Lutfi and the new captain, Sana Mehmood (Young Rising Star’s captain and central defender), participated in the inaugural SAFF Women's Championship held at Cox's Bazar Stadium. It stood second Group B, winning against Maldives (2–1) and Afghanistan (3–0), while losing heavily to Nepal (0–12). India were the opponents in the semifinal, but Pakistan lost 8–0 and were thus eliminated. In this tournament, Mehwish Khan became the first ever goal-scorer for Pakistan (in the match against Maldives).

As a result of these official matches, Pakistan entered the FIFA Women's World Rankings for the first time on 18 March 2011. It stood 121 in the World and 22 in Asia.

Further participations (2011–2014) 
In May 2011, four members of the team (Abiha Haidar, Roshnan Ali, Sara Mumtaz and coach Ishrat Fatima) went to the United States for a two-week FIFA Women’s World Cup Developing Program. They attended seminars, programs, meetings, and practice sessions in New York, New Jersey, Baltimore, and Washington, D.C. and visited various local colleges and universities. The group was also hosted for a special dinner at the White House by the US Government for boosting bilateral relations through sports promotion and development.

In September 2012, the team participated in the 2nd SAFF Women's Championship held in Colombo, Sri Lanka. Pakistan lost against Nepal (0–8) and Afghanistan (0–4) before earning a consolation win against Maldives (3–0).

Pakistan played its first international friendly series against Bahrain in October 2014. Three matches were played at the Bahrain National Stadium in Riffa, with the home side winning all of them. These matches were organized to help prepare the team for the upcoming 3rd edition of the SAFF Women's Championship.

Pakistan hosted the 2014 SAFF Women's Championship in November 2014, with all matches being held at Jinnah Sports Stadium in Islamabad. The hosts lost against Sri Lanka (1–2) and Nepal (0–2), but won against Bhutan (4–1), scoring four goals in a match for the first time.

Hiatus (2014–2022) 

From November 2014 to September 2022, the team saw no action due to the Pakistan Football Federation (PFF) being suspended several times by FIFA for infighting and third-party interference. The suspensions were removed occasionally, but not in time for Pakistan to participate in the 2016 and 2019 editions of the SAFF Women's Championship, and in the 2016 and 2019 editions of the South Asian Games. As a result of no matches being played, the team lost its FIFA ranking.

Return (2022–present) 
On 30 June 2022, FIFA lifted PFF's suspension after a period of 14 months. As a result, PFF was able to send in Pakistan women's team's entry for the 2022 SAFF Women's Championship. The entry was confirmed on 9 July 2022, which meant that the team would be playing its first international match since 2014. A 35-member training camp was held at Lahore in August 2022 under new head coach Adeel Rizki, after which a 23-member squad was announced on 24 August 2022. Hajra Khan, Malika-e-Noor, Syeda Mahpara, Nisha Ashraf, Roshnan Ali, Sahar Zaman, and Zulfia Nazir were the only players who were part of the team that last played in 2014; the rest were given their first call-ups. Two overseas players, Nadia Khan and Maria Khan, were also included for the first time. The captaincy was handed over to Maria Khan from Hajra Khan, while Malika-e-Noor was named the vice-captain.

Pakistan made its return to international football on 7 September 2022, with 58th-ranked India being its first opponent in the group stage of the 2022 SAFF Women's Championship at the Dasharath Rangasala in Kathmandu. Pakistan lost 3–0, which was followed by a  6–0 loss against Nepal in the next match which meant the team could not progress to the semifinals. In the final group stage fixture, Pakistan recorded its biggest win when it defeated Maldives 7–0, courtesy of four goals by Nadia Khan, who became the team's joint record goal scorer. It was also the first time a player had scored three goals or more in a match for Pakistan.

In January 2023, the team visited Saudi Arabia for a four-nation international friendly tournament. It won its first game 1–0 against Comoros, the first time it faced a non-Asian opponent, lost the next fixture 2–1 against Mauritius, before drawing the final match 1–1 against hosts Saudi Arabia. With four points in three matches, Pakistan finished as runners-up at the tournament, with captain Maria Khan being declared as the player of the tournament.

Results and fixtures

 The following is a list of match results in the last 12 months, as well as any future matches that have been scheduled.

Legend

2022

2023

Coaching staff

Current coaching staff

Manager history 
, after the match against .

Players

Current squad
The following 24 players were called up for the 2023 SAFF Women's Friendly Tournament.

Recent call-ups
 The following players have been called up to a Pakistan squad in recent years.

Competitive record

FIFA Women's World Cup

AFC Women's Asian Cup

*Draws include knockout matches decided on penalty kicks.

SAFF Women's Championship

South Asian Games

Head-to-head record 

 Key

The following table shows Pakistan's all-time official international record per opponent:

Last updated: Pakistan vs Saudi Arabia, 19 January 2023.

See also
Women's association football
Pakistan women's national under-17 football team
Pakistan women's national under-20 football team
Pakistan national football team

References

External links
Pakistan women's national football team – official website

Pakistan women's national football team
Women's national sports teams of Pakistan
Asian women's national association football teams